Colombières is a commune in the Calvados department in the Normandy region in northwestern France.

Geography
Colombières is situated in the north-western region of Calvados, 20 kilometres west of Bayeux and 9 kilometres from Isigny-sur-Mer, in the natural regional park of Cotentin and Bessin.

History
The village was freed on 9 June 1944 by the Allies. U.S. General Omar Bradley set up base for the Twelfth United States Army Group in Colombières castle.

Places of interest
Colombières castle is a historic building, built between Bayeux and Isigny-sur-Mer, close to the D-Day landing beaches. It was one of the most famous forts in Lower Normandy while France was under Feudal rule. It is also known as : La vigie des Marais (The marsh lookout).

Population

See also
Communes of the Calvados department

References

External links

 Château de Colombières own page - French
 Château de Colombières - official English website

Communes of Calvados (department)
Calvados communes articles needing translation from French Wikipedia